Megasaurus and Transaurus are transforming robotic dinosaurs.  Megasaurus is owned by Mike West and Transaurus is owned by Rick and Sheri Dorritie.  They are modeled after a Tyrannosaurus rex and have hydraulically activated arms, grasping claws, and jaws, as well as flame throwers set up in the head to give the effect of breathing fire from the mouth. They both fold up into a vehicle based on a tank and when the robots perform they initially appear as a box on tracks decorated as either a military vehicle (Megasaurus) or a dinosaur (Transaurus).  Each robot is roughly 30 feet tall at maximum extension.  They are used primarily to destroy cars by "eating" them (ripping them apart with the claws and jaws) at motorsport events, especially monster truck competitions.

Although owned by different parties, both robots were built by the same company and operate and look almost identical, except for decoration.  The robots have similar opening backstories used at shows while they are transforming, and the backstories reference both robots.  

Both robots are smaller imitations of the original Robosaurus, which was designed in 1988.

Megasaurus was featured on Extreme Makeover: Home Edition on January 18, 2009, where it was used to demolish the house of the Drumm family.

External links 

 
 

Robotic dinosaurs
Entertainment robots
2009 robots
Robots of the United States